"Los Últimos" (English: "The Last Ones") is a song by American singer Romeo Santos with Dominican singer Luis Vargas. It is the eleventh and final single for Santos' fourth studio album Utopía (2019). The music video was released on September 12, 2019.

Charts

References 

2019 singles
2019 songs
Bachata songs
Romeo Santos songs
Spanish-language songs
Sony Music Latin singles
Songs written by Romeo Santos
Male vocal duets